I en tid som vår (In a Time Like Ours) is the fifth studio album by Swedish singer-songwriter Marie Fredriksson, released on 4 November 1996 by EMI Sweden. The album was recorded and co-produced by Fredriksson alongside her husband Mikael Bolyos at their home studio in Djursholm. It was a commercial success upon release, peaking at number 2 for two non-consecutive weeks on the Swedish Albums Chart, and was certified platinum by the Swedish Recording Industry Association for shipments in excess of 80,000 units.

"Tro" was released as the first and only commercial single from the album, which became a substantial hit in Sweden, peaking within the top ten and spending over 6 months on the singles chart. The song remains Fredriksson's longest-charting single in her native country. "I en tid som vår" and "Ber bara en gång" were issued as limited-edition promotional singles.

Release and promotion
The album was released on 4 November 1996, although Fredriksson refused to engage in publicity to promote it. She was eight months pregnant with her second child at the time of its release. The record was preceded by its first and only commercial single, "Tro", which was released on 11 October 1996. The song became a substantial hit in Fredriksson's home territory, spending a total of 29 weeks on the Swedish Singles Chart, peaking at number 8 on its fourth week. The title track and "Ber bara en gång" were issued as limited edition promotional singles on 2 December 1996 and 24 February 1997, respectively. The former was limited to 700 copies, while the latter was limited to 600 copies; both singles were issued throughout Europe.

In The Look for Roxette: The Illustrated Worldwide Discography & Price Guide, author Robert Thorselius hypothesised that "Ber bara en gång" was issued in limited quantities to avoid competition between that song and Fredriksson's duet with former ABBA vocalist Anni-Frid Lyngstad, "Alla mina bästa år" ("All My Best Years"), which was released the same week. "Alla mina bästa år" peaked at number 54 in Sweden, and was taken from Frida's album Djupa andetag (Deep Breaths).

Critical reception

Nordic publication Nöjesguiden gave the album a mixed review. They called it "depressing", and accused Fredriksson's lyrics of being formulaic, writing: "On a Chris Isaak album, you are never too far from the word 'crying'. On a Marie Fredriksson album, it seems the word 'rain' comes along every fourth line [verse]. [...] The problem is that she formulated every syllable so vigilantly, and then you realise later that only the most initiated of fans understands what she's singing about". Conversely, Anders Hvidfeldt of Aftonbladet said that "unlike other people, I think that even millionaires from [affluent Stockholm suburb] Djursholm have the right to be sad sometimes." He praised the record as "exceptionally sad, [but] dazzling and autumn-like."

Commercial performance
The album was a commercial success upon release in Sweden, spending two non-consecutive weeks at number 2 on Sverigetopplistan. It was Fredriksson's third consecutive platinum-certified album from the Swedish Recording Industry Association, although the organisation had downgraded its certification levels for platinum albums from 100,000 to 80,000 units since the release of her previous studio album, 1992's Den ständiga resan (The Eternal Journey). The record was also released in Japan on 5 February 1997. It was remastered in 24-bit quality and reissued on HDCD in June 2002 as part of the six-disc Kärlekens guld (Love's Gold) box set, and was later reissued as a separate CD on 5 March 2003.

Formats and track listing
All songs written by Marie Fredriksson, except "Herren ber för dig" by Fredriksson and Mikael Bolyos.

Credits and personnel
Credits adapted from the liner notes of I en tid som vår.

 Recorded at Studio Vinden in Djursholm, Sweden between February and September 1996.
 Mastered by Peter Dahl at Cutting Room Studios, Stockholm

Musicians
 Marie Fredriksson – vocals, piano, lyricist, composition, arrangements, production and mixing
 Mikael Bolyos – keyboards, arrangements, production and mixing
 Staffan Astner – guitars
 Janos Döme – viola
 Nacka Musikklasser  – choir
 Nacka Musikskolas  – choir
 Max Schultz – guitars
 Nicki Wallin – drums
 Sven Zetterberg – harmonica

Technical personnel
 Kjell Andersson – artwork
 Hans Carlén – photography
 Mattias Edwall – photography
 Alar Suurna – mixing

Charts

Weekly charts

Year-end charts

Certifications

Release history

References

External links
 
 Official website

Marie Fredriksson albums
1996 albums